The 1914 Rhode Island gubernatorial election was held on November 3, 1914. Republican nominee Robert Livingston Beeckman defeated Democratic nominee Patrick H. Quinn with 53.80% of the vote.

General election

Candidates
Major party candidates
Robert Livingston Beeckman, Republican
Patrick H. Quinn, Democratic

Other candidates
Edward W. Theinert, Socialist
F. D. Thompson, Progressive
Ernest L. Merry, Prohibition
Peter McDermott, Socialist Labor

Results

References

1914
Rhode Island
Gubernatorial